Papadopol is a Romanian-language surname derived from the Greek Papadopoulos ("son of a priest"). People with the surname include:

Alexandru Papadopol, actor
Alexandru Papadopol-Calimah, historian and political figure

References

Greek-language surnames
Romanian-language surnames
Occupational surnames